Robert Saladrigas Riera (Barcelona, 12 February 1940 – 22 October 2018, Barcelona) was a Spanish writer, journalist and literary critic, renowned for his articles on foreign literature published in CULTURA/S, the literary supplement of La Vanguardia newspaper. His literary work has been translated into Spanish, Portuguese and Romanian.

Biography

He started Economics studies but very soon switched to journalism and literature. In 1974 he founded Edicions Galba, which he led until 1978. From 1978 to 1984 he directed in the Catalan Circuit of TVE the cultural programmes Signes and Veus i formes, the five-episode novel Cambres Barrades and the series "Històries de Cara i Creu", which consists of thirteen short stories. He was in charge of and participated in other cultural programmes on Ràdio 4, Radio Peninsular,  and Catalunya Ràdio.

Bibliography
 Novels in Catalan
 1966 El cau
 1967 Entre juliol i setembre
 1970 Boires
 1970 L'Àlex, el 8 i el 10
 1970 52 hores a través de la pell
 1971 El viatge prodigiós d'en Ferran Pinyol
 1977 Històries a mig camí
 1977 Aquell gust agre de l'estel
 1979 Néixer de nou, cada dia
 1980 Pel camí ral del nord
 1981 Sota la volta del temps
 1983 Imatges del meu mirall
 1983 Sóc Emma
 1984 Visions de cada hora
 1986 Memorial de Claudi M. Broch
 1990 Claris
 1991 Tauromàquia: sol i lluna
 1992 El sol de la tarda
 1994 Un temps del diable
 1995 Amic Lu
 1996 La mar no està mai sola
 1999 Còmplices de ciutat
 2004 La llibreta groga
 2005 Biografia
 2008 L'altre
 2012 L'estiu de la pluja
 Essays in Catalan
 1973 L'Escola del Mar i la renovació pedagògica a Catalunya. Converses amb Pere Vergés
 1974 Literatura i societat a la Catalunya d'avui
 2014 Paraules d'escriptors. Monòlegs amb creadors catalans dels setanta
 Essays in Spanish
 1965 Notas de un viaje
 1967 Arañas
 1972 Las confesiones no católicas de España
 2012 Voces del "boom". Monólogos
 2013 De un lector que cuenta. Impresiones sobre la narrativa extranjera contemporánea. De Thomas Mann a Jonathan Franzen
 2014 Rostros escritos. Monólogos con creadores españoles de los setenta
 2017 En tierra de ficción. Recorrido por la narrativa contemporánea. De Edgar Allan Poe a Evan Dara

Awards
 1966 Joaquim Ruyra for Entre juliol i setembre
 1969 Víctor Català for Boires
 1986 Premi de la crítica for Memorial de Claudi M. Broch
 1991 Sant Jordi de Novel·la for El sol de la tarda
 1992 Joan Crexells for El sol de la tarda
 1996 Carlemany for La mar no està mai sola
 2004 Josep Pla Award for La llibreta groga

References

External links
 http://www.escriptors.cat/autors/saladrigasr/

Catalan-language writers
Journalists from Catalonia
Writers from Barcelona
1940 births
2018 deaths